Avaranqışlaq (also, Avaran-Kishlag and Avarankyshlak) is a village and municipality in the Qusar Rayon of Azerbaijan.  It has a population of 450.

References 

Populated places in Qusar District